Ramya Pandian is an Indian actress who works in Tamil-language films. She is known for her role in Joker (2016) and Aan Devathai (2018). She was listed by the Chennai Times as the  "Most Desirable Woman on Television 2020". She is the 3rd runner-up of the reality show Bigg Boss Tamil Season 4 (2020-2021).

Career 
Ramya Pandian received her bachelor's degree in Biomedical Engineering from College of Engineering, Guindy affiliated to Anna University. After graduation, she started working as a Research and Development Analyst before being promoted as a Business Development Manager. She got the opportunity to work with Mani Ratnam's assistant director, Shelley, on a short film title Maane Theyne Ponmaane. She auditioned and landed a role in Balaji Sakthivel's Ra Ra Rajasekhar, but the film did not materialise during that time. She subsequently went on to make her acting debut with the low budget Dummy Tappasu (2015). The team of Ra Ra Rajasekhar recommended her to Raju Murugan who subsequently signed her up for Joker (2016). She played a village belle in the film.

Samuthirakani appreciated Ramya's performance in Joker and asked her if she was interested in doing a role in Aan Devathai (2018) as a mother who works for an IT company. Ramya agreed to do the film after listening to the story. In a review of the film, a critic from India Today noted that "Ramya Pandian is mostly convincing as the mother of two, struggling to balance between being a mother and pursuing her career".

She was a contestant on the cooking show, Cooku with Comali and a judge on the comedy television show, Kalakka Povathu Yaaru. She was the second runner-up in Cooku with Comali. In 2020, she had participated as a contestant in the fourth season of the reality show Bigg Boss Tamil, making her a household name. She was the only female finalist and emerged as the 2nd Runner-Up. She played the female lead in the web series Mugilan, which released on ZEE5 in October 2020. Her upcoming projects include a film produced by Suriya's 2D Entertainment and a film produced by C. V. Kumar's Thirukumaran Entertainment.

Personal life 
Ramya Pandian is the daughter of former film director Durai Pandian, and niece of actor Arun Pandian, who works in Tamil-language films. Her family is from Tirunelveli. She has mentioned her interest in organic gardening.

Filmography

Film

Web series

Television

References

External links 
 

1990 births
Living people
21st-century Indian actresses
Actresses in Tamil cinema
Bigg Boss (Tamil TV series) contestants
Indian film actresses
Actresses in Malayalam cinema